The Saurer D 330 N is a truck model, which established by the Adolph Saurer AG at Arbon in 1979. The Saurer D330N prevailed over the FBW 80N in the evaluation.  The Swiss Army used these trucks in engineer/sapper and rescue units.
One is on display at the Schweizerisches Militärmuseum Full, and another one at the Zuger Depot Technikgeschichte.

References
 Kurt Sahli, Jo Wiedmer: Saurer. Nutzfahrzeuge damals und heute. Buri, Bern 1983, .
militärfahrzeuge.ch Technical infos in German
Fahrzeuge der Schweizer Armee by Markus Hofmann (2000)

Military trucks of Switzerland
Off-road vehicles
Military vehicles of Switzerland